Xi'an Road Commercial Zone (in ) is the second busiest commercial area, after Qingniwaqiao, in Dalian City, Liaoning Province, China.

West of downtown Dalian
Located a few kilometers west of Qingniwaqiao in downtown Dalian, Xi'an Road Commercial Zone along Xi'an Road, from Jiefang Square in the south to Shahekou Railway Station in the north, is the second busiest commercial area, after Qingniwaqiao, in Dalian City, Liaoning Province, China.

This is a relatively new commercial area, which started to be developed approximately from 2001.

Commercial center
 Fujia Xintiandi
 Wal-Mart
 Parkson
 Changxing Market
 Suning Appliance
 GOME Electrical Appliances
 Dalian Electronic City
 Pizza Hut
 Roosevelt Center
 Dalian HuaChen Cinplex 
 Mykal Department Store
 Amici Coffee
 McCafé
 Yoshinoya
 Sunrise Shopping Center()
 Carrefour
 McDonald's
 KFC
Xinhua Bookstore's Northern Book Town
 China Mobile, China Unicom and China Telecom  Xi'an Road Sales Branches

Social service
 Dalian City Dentist Hospital
 Dalian Locomotive Hospital
 Dalian City Christian Church for Korean Chinese

Transportation
This section of Xi'an Road is crossed by Wuyi Road, Huanghe Road and Changjiang Road.

See also
 Dalian City
 Qingniwaqiao

References

Dalian
Roads in China
Geography of Liaoning